Andros Maritime Museum is a museum in Andros, Greece. It was founded in 1972 for the purpose of gathering and preserving naval objects found in Andros. The museum is established in an old building in the city of Andros that was given to municipality of Andros by Dimitrios Rallias.

Exhibits
The objects that are exhibited are related to Andros' naval life. There are a lot of lithography presenting everyday life, insurance policies, cutlery, uniforms, naval diaries, where the life of the Andriots on the seas before the 1821 War of Independence is described. There are also displayed models of ships, ranging from old schooners to huge modern tankers.

These exhibits are original and vividly present the entire history of Andros' merchant marine, from antiquity to our day.

References

Citations

Sources

External links
 Maritime Museum in andros-guide.gr
 Maritime Museum of Andros in www.e-kyklades.gr

Maritime museums in Greece
Buildings and structures in Andros
Museums in the South Aegean
Museums established in 1972
1972 establishments in Greece